Lorne is a given name and place name especially popular in Canada, due to the Marquess of Lorne, who was Governor General of Canada (1878–1883). Lorne may refer to:

People

Given name
Lorne Anderson (1931–1984), Canadian hockey player
Lorne Armstrong (born 1970), American Lull Operator
Lorne Atkinson (1921–2010) Canadian cyclist
Lorne Babiuk (born 1946), Canadian scientist
Lorne Balfe, composer
Lorne Bonnell (1923–2006), Canadian politician
Lorne Calvert (born 1952), Canadian politician
Lorne Campbell (disambiguation)
Lorne Cardinal (born 1964), Canadian actor
Lorne Carr (1910–2007), Canadian hockey player
Lorne Chabot (1900–1946), Canadian hockey player
Lorne Clarke (judge) (1928–2016), Canadian judge
Lorne Clarke (singer), Canadian singer-songwriter & concert promoter
Lorne Currie (1871–1926), British sailor
Lorne Davis (1930–2007), Canadian hockey player and scout
Lorne Duguid (1910–1981), Canadian hockey player
Lorne Elias, Canadian chemist and inventor
Lorne Elliott (born 1974), Canadian comedian
Lorne Entress, American musician
Lorne Ferguson (1930–2008), Canadian hockey player
Lorne Frohman, Canadian comedy writer and producer; see Pink Lady (TV series)
Lorne Greenaway (1933–2010), Canadian politician
Lorne Greene (1915–1987), Canadian-born television actor
Lorne Henderson (1920–2002), Canadian politician
Lorne Henning (born 1952), Canadian hockey executive
Lorne Kusugak, Canadian politician
Lorne Lanning (born 1964), American game designer
Lorne Lofsky (born 1954), Canadian jazz musician
Lorne Loomer (1937–2017), Canadian rower
Lorne Mayencourt (born 1957), Canadian politician
Lorne Michaels (born 1944), Canadian-born television producer
Lorne Molleken (born 1956), Canadian hockey player
Lorne Nystrom (born 1946), Canadian politician
Lorne Peterson, Canadian special effect artist
Lorne Reznowski (1929–2011), Canadian politician
Robert Lorne Richardson (1860–1921), Canadian journalist
Lorne Rubenstein (born 1948), Canadian sports journalist
Lorne Sam (born 1984), American football player
Lorne Saxberg (1958–2006), Canadian television anchorman
Lorne Spicer (born 1965), British television presenter
Lorne Stamler (born 1951), Canadian hockey player
Lorne Taylor (born 1944), Canadian politician
Lorne Trottier (born 1948), Canadian businessman
Lorne Welch (1916–1998), British engineer and pilot
Lorne Gump Worsley (1929–2007), Canadian hockey player

Surname
Dúghall of Lorne (died 1403), Scottish prelate
Marion Lorne (1883–1968), American actress
Tommy Lorne (1890–1935), Scottish comedian
Marquess of Lorne, courtesy title for the heir to the Dukedom of Argyll

Fiction
Lorne (Angel), fictional character in the television series Angel
Evan Lorne, fictional character in the television series Stargate SG-1 and Stargate Atlantis
Lorne Malvo, fictional character in the television series Fargo

Places

Australia 
Lake Lorne, Victoria
Lorne, Victoria
Lorne, New South Wales, near Camden Haven River

Canada 
Rural Municipality of Lorne, Manitoba
Lorne, New Brunswick, a local service district in Restigouche County
Lorne Parish, New Brunswick, in Victoria County
Lorne (electoral district), Northwest Territories
Lorne Park, Ontario
Mount Lorne, Yukon
Mount Lorne (electoral district), Yukon Territory

Scotland 
Firth of Lorn
Lorne, Scotland

United States 
Lorne, Minnesota
Lorne, Virginia

Other uses
Lorne plateau lavas
Lorne sausage, a traditional Scottish large square sausage served in slices
Marquess of Lorne, courtesy title for the Duke of Argyll's eldest son and heir, currently Archibald Campbell, Marquess of Lorne

See also
Loren (disambiguation)
Lorneville (disambiguation)